Albert Henry Manger (May 21, 1899 – March 1985) was an American weightlifter who competed in the 1932 Summer Olympics. In 1932 he finished fifth in the heavyweight class. He died in Baltimore, Maryland.

References

1899 births
1985 deaths
Sportspeople from Baltimore
American male weightlifters
Olympic weightlifters of the United States
Weightlifters at the 1932 Summer Olympics
19th-century American people
20th-century American people